Pirca Pirca (possibly from Aymara and Quechua pirqa wall) is an archaeological site in Peru. It is located in the Lima Region, Yauyos Province, Tanta District. Pirca Pirca was declared a National Cultural Heritage of Peru by Resolución Viceministerial No. 011-2013-VMPCIC-MC on February 7, 2013. It lies north of Lake Paucarcocha.

See also 
 Khuchi Mach'ay

References

Archaeological sites in Lima Region
Archaeological sites in Peru